Pulau Sekati Bridge or Jambatan Pulau Sekati (Jawi: جمبتن ڤولاو سكاتي) is a new bridge in Kuala Terengganu, Terengganu, Malaysia, which crosses Terengganu River. The bridge is the longest bridge in Terengganu after Sultan Mahmud Bridge. Only the part of the bridge connecting Losong to Pulau Sekati has been opened to the public with the rest of the bridge connecting Jalan Banggul Tuan Muda to Jeram Tokong to be opened on 19 June.

See also
 
 
 
 Sultan Mahmud Bridge

References

Bridges completed in 2017
Bridges in Terengganu